Darren Grant is an American television, film and music video director. He has directed over eighty music videos for mostly R&B and hip hop artists.

In 2005, Grant directed his debut film Tyler Perry's Diary of a Mad Black Woman. In 2008, he directed the film Make It Happen starring Mary Elizabeth Winstead.

Videography

1997
Frankie - "If I Had You"
Dru Hill - "In My Bed (So So Def Remix)"
Common feat. Chantay Savage - "Reminding Me (of Sef)"
Brian McKnight feat. Mase - "You Should Be Mine"
Aaliyah - "The One I Gave My Heart To"
Kirk Franklin & God's Property - "Stomp"
Sam Salter - "After 12, Before 6"
Playa - "Don't Stop the Music"
Destiny's Child - "No, No, No (part 1)"
Destiny's Child feat Wyclef Jean - "No, No, No (part 2)"
Brian McKnight - "Anytime"
Rampage feat. 702 - "We Getz Down"
Timbaland & Magoo - "Luv 2 Luv U"
Ginuwine - "Only When U R Lonely"
Suga Free - "If U Stay Ready"
Cru - "Bubblin'"

1998
Big Pun feat. Joe - "Still Not A Player"
98 Degrees - "Was It Something I Didn't Say"
Brian McKnight - "Hold Me"
Destiny's Child feat. Jermaine Dupri- "With Me (part 1)"
SWV - "Rain"
TQ - "Westside"
Deborah Cox - "Nobody's Supposed to Be Here"

1999
Boyz II Men - "I Will Get There"
Destiny's Child - "Bills, Bills, Bills"
Monica - "Street Symphony"
Jordan Knight - "Give It to You"
Jordan Knight - "I Could Never Take the Place of Your Man"
Destiny's Child - "Bug a Boo" (version 1)
Tamar Braxton feat. Jermaine Dupri & Amil - "Get None"

2000
702 – "Gotta Leave"
Mary Mary – "Shackles (Praise You)"
Lucy Pearl – "Dance Tonight"
Ideal feat. Lil' Mo – "Whatever"
Boyz II Men – "Pass You By"
Amil featuring Beyoncé – "I Got That"
Next – "Beauty Queen"
Boyz II Men – "Thank You in Advance"

2001
Craig David – "Fill Me In" (USA version)
Jewel – "Standing Still"
3LW – "Playas Gon' Play"
Destiny's Child – "Survivor"
Destiny's Child featuring Da Brat – "Survivor (Remix)"
The Corrs – "All the Love in the World"
De La Soul – "Baby Phat"
Lina – "It's Alright"

2002
Jaheim featuring Next – "Anything"
Samantha Mumba – "I'm Right Here"
Jaheim – "Fabulous"
Trina feat. Ludacris – "B R Right"
Aaliyah – "Miss You"

2003
Jaheim – "Put That Woman First"
Heather Headley – "I Wish I Wasn't"
Gang Starr featuring Jadakiss – "Rite Where U Stand"
Mýa – "Fallen"

2004
Nicole Wray - "If I Was Your Girlfriend"

2005
India.Arie - "Purify Me"
Jaheim featuring Jadakiss - "Everytime I Think of Her"
Howie Day - "She Says"
Kirk Franklin - "Looking For You"

2006
Tamia -  "Can’t Get Enough"

2007
Vanessa Hudgens - "Say OK" (Version 2)

2011
Mary Mary - "Survive"

2012
Mary Mary - "Go Get It"
Cody Simpson - "So Listen"

Filmography

Films
Diary of a Mad Black Woman (2005)
Make It Happen (2008)
Man-Eater (2014)
Killing Hasselhoff (2017)

Television
Blaze Studios (2012) (TV movie)
Verses & Flow (2015) (7 episodes)
Saints & Sinners (2016–17) (10 episodes)
The Chi (2018–20) (3 episodes)
Unsolved: The Murders of Tupac and The Notorious B.I.G. (2018) ("Half the Job")
Queen of the South (2018–19) ("La Fuerza" and "Hospitalidad Sureña")
Supernatural (2018) ("Nightmare Logic")
God Friended Me (2019) (2 episodes)
All American (2019) ("m.A.A.d. City")
Legacies (2019–21) (3 episodes)
Empire (2019) ("Never Doubt I Love")
Scream (2019) (2 episodes)
The Purge (2019) ("Should I Stay or Should I Go")
Soundtrack (2019) (2 episodes)
Barkskins (2020) ("Buttermilk")
L.A.'s Finest (2020) ("Rafferty and The Gold Dust Twins")
Wendy Williams: The Movie (2021) (TV Movie)
Big Sky (2021) ("Mother Nurture")
Billions (2022) ("Succession")

References

External links

Darren Grant at MVDBase.com

African-American film directors
American film directors
American film producers
American music video directors
Living people
Place of birth missing (living people)
Year of birth missing (living people)
21st-century African-American people